"Silent Bible" is the 22nd single by Japanese singer and voice actress Nana Mizuki, released on February 10, 2010 by King Records. This is the first single which songs were featured in two different video games created by Namco Bandai Games.

Track listing 
 "Silent Bible"
Lyrics: Nana Mizuki
Composition: Haruki Mori (Elements Garden)
Arrangement: Daisuke Kikuta (Elements Garden)
Opening theme for PlayStation Portable game Magical Girl Lyrical Nanoha A's Portable: The Battle of Aces
 "Polaris"
Lyrics: Yumi Moriguchi & Shin Furuya
Composition: Yumi Moriguchi
Arrangement: Jun Suyama
 "UNCHAIN∞WORLD"
Lyrics: Hibiki
Composition: Noriyasu Agematsu (Elements Garden)
Arrangement: Masato Nakayama (Elements Garden)
Opening theme for Nintendo DS game Super Robot Taisen OG Saga: Endless Frontier EXCEED
 "undercover"
Lyrics: Shōko Fujibayashi
Composition: Shinya Saitō
Arrangement: Shinya Saitō

Charts
Oricon Sales Chart (Japan)

References

2010 singles
Nana Mizuki songs
Songs written by Nana Mizuki